Andrei Sergeyevich Gatsko (born 11 September 1986) is a Russian professional football player. He plays for FC Rus Dneprovskaya.

Club career
He played 6 seasons in the Russian Football National League for FC Mashuk-KMV Pyatigorsk, FC Torpedo Vladimir and FC Baltika Kaliningrad.

External links
 
 

1986 births
Living people
Russian footballers
Association football midfielders
FC Slavyansk Slavyansk-na-Kubani players
FC Krasnodar players
FC Rotor Volgograd players
FC Sheksna Cherepovets players
FC Baltika Kaliningrad players
FC Torpedo Vladimir players
FC Chita players
FC Mashuk-KMV Pyatigorsk players